Théodore Eberhard (29 August 1812 – 12 May 1874) was a Luxembourgish architect and politician.

Biography 
Eberhard was born in Luxembourg City.

He was a member of the Chamber of Deputies from 1851 to 1854 and of the Assemblée des États from 1857 to 1866. He served as an échevin of Luxembourg City from 1850 to 1854 and from 1859 to 1865, then as mayor of the city between 1865 and 1869.

Eberhard died in Luxembourg City on May 12, 1874 at the age of 61.

A street in the Belair district of Luxembourg City is named after him.

Architectural works 
 Saint Michel Church, Mersch
 Nospelt Church
 Bivange Church

References 

1812 births
Luxembourgian architects
Members of the Chamber of Deputies (Luxembourg)
Mayors of Luxembourg City
1874 deaths